John and Julie (1955) is a British comedy film, starring Colin Gibson, Lesley Dudley, Noelle Middleton and Moira Lister, and featuring Peter Sellers and Sid James in early screen roles.

Plot
The film is set in 1953 in the week leading up to the coronation of Queen Elizabeth II.

John (Gibson) and Julie (Dudley) are two young children from Dorset who are eager to see the Coronation of Queen Elizabeth II in spite of the fact that their respective parents have no intention of going. When the two are left alone they decide to run off to London to see John's 'Uncle Ben' who is in the Life Guards and therefore "he knows the queen".

They steal a horse and take it to the railway station where they buy two tickets to London but John is put off when he loses his ticket. Luckily Julie gets off too. Next Julie joins a group of Brownies on their chartered bus to London, but John is not allowed on because he is a boy. He steals a bike to follow the bus, with each theft leaving an apology note. Julie asks the bus to stop to go to the toilet but is actually trying to feed John.

Eventually in London they get separated in the huge crowd. Julie is taken under the wing of a well-dressed street girl. They are reunited in Trafalgar Square.

Along their way, they encounter different quirky and eccentric people who help them achieve their goal and see the Queen's procession.

At the end of the film all the individuals who were part of the story appear in the crowds watching the Queen go to her coronation.

Cast

 Colin Gibson as John Pritchett
 Lesley Dudley as Julie
 Noelle Middleton as Miss Stokes
 Moira Lister as Dora
 Wilfrid Hyde-White as Sir James, a Field Marshal in the Life Guards
 Sid James as Mr Pritchett, John's father
 Megs Jenkins as Mrs Pritchett, John's mother
 Joseph Tomelty as Mr Davidson, a judge on holiday from America
 Constance Cummings as Mrs Davidson, his wife
 Patric Doonan as Jim Webber, a bicycle shop owner
 Andrew Cruickshank as Uncle Ben, a Corporal of Horse in the Life Guards
 Peter Coke as captain in the Life Guards
 Colin Gordon as Mr Swayne, a boys' group leader
 Winifred Shotter as Mrs Swayne, his wife
 Peter Jones as Jeremy
 Vincent Ball as Digger
 Peter Sellers as Police Constable Diamond
 Patrick Connor as Trooper Rogers
 Philip Stainton as a London police sergeant
 Mona Washbourne as Miss Rendlesham 
 Molly Weir as Landlady
 Katie Johnson as woman in street

Frazer Hines who later became known for his portrayal of Jamie McCrimmon in Doctor Who had a minor role.

Production

Filming took place at Beaconsfield Studios. It is interspersed with footage from the day of the coronation.

Reception

In September 1956, Maclean's film reviewer, Clyde Gilmour described the film as, "A predictable little comedy-adventure, good fun for most youngsters and bolstered by newsreel shots of the actual event."

Halliwell's Film Video & DVD Guide describes the film as, "Genial little family comedy full of stock comic characters."

Box Office
According to the National Film Finance Corporation, the film made a comfortable profit. According to Kinematograph Weekly it was a "money maker" at the British box office in 1955.

Home Media

In 2007, John and Julie was released on DVD as part of the Long Lost Comedy Classics collection.

References

Bibliography

 Walker, John. (ed). (2004). Halliwell's Film Video & DVD Guide. HarperCollins Entertainment. 19th edition

External links
 
 
 John and Julie at AllMovie
 John and Julie at Rotten Tomatoes

1955 films
British comedy films
1955 comedy films
Films produced by Herbert Mason
Films set in 1953
1950s English-language films
Films directed by William Fairchild
1950s British films